The United States budget process is the framework used by Congress and the President of the United States to formulate and create the United States federal budget. The process was established by the Budget and Accounting Act of 1921, the Congressional Budget and Impoundment Control Act of 1974, and additional budget legislation.

Prior to 1974, Congress had no formal process for establishing a federal budget. When President Richard Nixon began to refuse to spend funds that Congress had allocated, they adopted a more formal means by which to challenge him. The Congressional Budget Act of 1974 created the Congressional Budget Office (CBO), which gained more control of the budget, limiting the power of the President's Office of Management and Budget (OMB).  The Act passed easily while the administration was embroiled in the Watergate scandal and was unwilling to provoke Congress.

Discretionary spending 

Discretionary spending requires an annual appropriation bill, which is a piece of legislation.  Discretionary spending is typically set by the House and Senate Appropriations Committees and their various subcommittees. Since the spending is typically for a fixed period (usually a year), it is said to be under the discretion of the Congress. Some appropriations last for more than one year (see Appropriation bill for details). In particular, multi-year appropriations are often used for housing programs and military procurement programs.

As of 2019, there are 12 appropriations bills which need to be passed each fiscal year in order for continued discretionary spending to occur. The subject of each appropriations bill corresponds to the jurisdiction of the respective House and Senate appropriation subcommittees:

Multiple bills are sometimes combined into one piece of legislation, such as the Omnibus Appropriations Act, 2009.  A continuing resolution is often passed if an appropriations bill has not been signed into law by the end of the fiscal year.

Authorization bills 

In general, funds for federal government programs must be authorized by an "authorizing committee" through enactment of legislation. Then, through subsequent acts by Congress, budget authority is appropriated by the Appropriations Committee of the House. In principle, committees with jurisdiction to authorize programs make policy decisions, while the Appropriations Committees decide on funding levels, limited to a program's authorized funding level, though the amount may be any amount less than the limit. But it all starts with the president's budget.

Annual process

Presidential budget request
The United States budget process begins when the President of the United States submits a budget request to Congress. The President's budget is formulated over a period of months with the assistance of the Office of Management and Budget (OMB), the largest office within the Executive Office of the President. The budget request includes funding requests for all federal executive departments and independent agencies. Budget documents include supporting documents and historical budget data and contains detailed information on spending and revenue proposals, along with policy proposals and initiatives with significant budgetary implications. The President's budget request constitutes an extensive proposal of the administration's intended revenue and spending plans for the following fiscal year. The budget proposal includes volumes of supporting information intended to persuade Congress of the necessity and value of the budget provisions. In addition, each federal executive department and independent agency provides additional detail and supporting documentation on its own funding requests. The documents are also posted on the OMB website.

The Budget and Accounting Act of 1921 requires the President to submit the budget to Congress for each fiscal year, which is the 12-month period beginning on October 1 and ending on September 30 of the next calendar year. The current federal budget law ((a)) requires that the President submit the budget between the first Monday in January and the first Monday in February. In recent times, the President's budget has been submitted in the first week of February. The budget submission has been delayed, however, in some new presidents' first year when the previous president belonged to a different party. The 2014 United States federal budget was not submitted by the President until April 10, 2013 due to negotiations over the United States fiscal cliff and implementation of the sequester cuts mandated by the Budget Control Act of 2011 (the House had already prepared its budget proposal on March 21, and the Senate proposed a budget on March 23).

President Warren G. Harding brought about the enactment of the Budget and Accounting Act of 1921, which, for the first time, required the President to submit a budget annually to Congress and which established the Bureau of the Budget, the forerunner of the Office of Management and Budget, to assist in the formulation of the budget. Initially the Bureau was within the U.S. Department of the Treasury, but in 1939 it was moved to the Executive Office of the President.

Budget resolution
The budget resolution is in the form of a concurrent resolution passed by both the House of Representatives and the Senate but is not presented to the President and does not have the force of law. It sets out the congressional budget. The budget resolution establishes various budget totals, allocations, entitlements, and may include reconciliation instructions to designated House or Senate committees. A particularity of the budget (and reconciliation) process is that members of Congress may offer unlimited amendments to budget resolutions, which are normally quickly disposed of at the end of the statutory 50 hours of debate in a so-called "vote-a-rama".

The President's budget submission is referred to the House and Senate Budget Committees and to the Congressional Budget Office (CBO). Other committees with budgetary responsibilities submit requests and estimates to the budget committees during this time.

In March, the CBO publishes an analysis of the President's proposals. The CBO budget report and other publications are also posted on the CBO website. CBO computes a current-law baseline budget projection that is intended to estimate what federal spending and revenues would be in the absence of new legislation for the current fiscal year and for the coming 10 fiscal years. However, the CBO also computes a current-policy baseline, which makes assumptions about, for instance, votes on tax cut sunset provisions. The current CBO 10-year budget baseline projection grows from $4.1 trillion in 2018 to $7.0 trillion in 2028.

In March, the budget committees consider the President's budget proposals in the light of the CBO budget report, and each committee submits a budget resolution to its house by April 1. The House and Senate each consider these budget resolutions, and are expected to pass them, possibly with amendments, by April 15. A budget resolution is a kind of concurrent resolution; it is not a law, and therefore does not require the President's signature.

There is no obligation for either or both houses of Congress to pass a budget resolution. There may not be a resolution every year; if none is established, the previous year's resolution remains in force. For example, the Senate had not passed a budget resolution for FY2011, FY2012, or FY2013, but did pass the FY2014 budget resolution on March 23, 2013, 23 days before the April 15 deadline set by the No Budget, No Pay Act of 2013. This was the first budget resolution passed by the Senate since a FY2010 budget passed on April 29, 2009. The House and Senate may propose a budget independently of the President's budget. For example, for the 2014 budget process, the House prepared its budget proposal on March 21, and the Senate proposed a budget on March 23, while the President's budget was not submitted until April 10.

After both houses pass a budget resolution, selected Representatives and Senators negotiate a conference report to reconcile differences between the House and the Senate versions. The conference report, in order to become binding, must be approved by both the House and Senate. The budget resolution serves as a blueprint for the actual appropriation process and provides Congress with some control over the appropriation process. All new discretionary spending requires authority through enactment of appropriation bills or continuing resolutions.

Each function within the budget may include "budget authority" and "outlays" that fall within the broad categories of discretionary spending or direct spending.

Allocations 
The 302(a) allocation specifies the total amount of money available to appropriates.  They are generally included in the report accompanying the budget resolution, or if a budget resolution is not passed, each chamber may determine its own 302(a) allocation.  This process was modified somewhat by the Budget Control Act of 2011, which is in effect though FY2021, which sets two overall caps for defense and nondefense spending that the 302(a) allocation must adhere to.  The Bipartisan Budget Act of 2018 and the Bipartisan Budget Act of 2019, also in effect through FY2021, gave the Chairs of the Budget Committees authority to determine 302(a) allocations.

The 302(b) allocations specify how funds are divided among the individual appropriations subcommittees, corresponding to the 12 appropriations bills.  302(b) allocations are adopted by the full House and Senate Appropriations Committees.

Appropriations bills 

The budget resolutions specify funding levels for the House and Senate Appropriations Committees and their 12 subcommittees, establishing various budget totals, allocations, entitlements, and may include reconciliation instructions to designated House or Senate committees. The appropriations committees start  with allocations in the budget resolution and draft appropriations bills, which may be considered in the House after May 15. Once appropriations committees pass their bills, they are considered by the House and Senate. When there is a final budget, the spending available to each appropriations committee for the coming fiscal year is usually provided in the joint explanatory statement included in the conference report. The appropriations committees then allocate that amount among their respective subcommittees, each to allocate the funds they control among the programs within their jurisdiction.

A conference committee is typically required to resolve differences between House and Senate appropriation bills. Once a conference bill has passed both chambers of Congress, it is sent to the President, who may sign the bill or veto it. If he signs, the bill becomes law. Otherwise, Congress must pass another bill to avoid a shutdown of at least part of the federal government.

In recent years, Congress has not passed all of the appropriations bills before the start of the fiscal year. Congress may then enact continuing resolutions that provide for the temporary funding of government operations. Failure to appropriate funds results in a partial government shutdown, such the federal government shutdown in October 2013.

In practice, the separation between policy making and funding and the division between appropriations and authorization activities are imperfect. Authorizations for many programs have long lapsed, yet still receive appropriated amounts, while other programs that are authorized receive no funds at all.  In addition, policy language, which is legislative text changing permanent law, is included in appropriation measures.

Reconciliation bills 

The budget resolution may also specify that a reconciliation bill may be introduced, which is subject to restrictions in its content but cannot be filibustered in the Senate.

Apportionment 

Apportionment is the process by which the Office of Management and Budget specifies the funding level for specific agencies and programs within the constraints of the appropriations bills after they have passed.

Mandatory spending 

Direct spending, also known as mandatory spending, refers to spending enacted by law, but not dependent on an annual or periodic appropriation bill. Most mandatory spending consists of transfer payments and earned benefits such as Social Security benefits, Medicare, and Medicaid. Many other expenses, such as salaries of federal judges, are mandatory, but account for a relatively small share of federal spending. The Congressional Budget Office (CBO) estimates costs of mandatory spending programs on a regular basis.

Congress can affect spending on entitlement programs by changing eligibility requirements or the structure of programs. Certain programs, because the language authorizing them are included in appropriation bills, are termed "appropriated entitlements." This is a convention rather than a substantive distinction, since the programs, such as Food Stamps, would continue to be funded even were the appropriation bill to be vetoed or otherwise not enacted.

Budget functions 
The federal budget is divided into categories known as budget functions. These functions include all spending for a given topic, regardless of the federal agency that oversees the individual federal program. Both the President's budget, and Congress' budget resolution provide summaries by function, but they do not line up with the twelve appropriations bills.

List of budget functions:

See also 
 Office of Management and Budget
 United States public debt
 Budget resolution
 Government financial statements
 Anti-Deficiency Act
 2015 United States federal appropriations

References

External links
 The Congressional Budget Process: an Explanation - published by the Senate Budget Committee, 1998 (PDF file)
Congressional Budget Resolutions: Historical Information Congressional Research Service March 13, 2012
Deeming Resolutions: Budget Enforcement in the Absence of a Budget Resolution Congressional Research Service Updated October 29, 2018
 2007 Financial Report of the United States Government 
 Columbia University selective guide for research on the U.S. Federal budget process
 Budget Process Tutorial From the House Budget Committee (Republican Staff) 
 The Congressional Budget Office
 Eric M. Patashnik, "Ideas, Inheritances, and the Dynamics of Budgetary Change," Governance, 12.2 (April 1999): 147-174
 Understanding the Federal Budget

Process